A mitraillette (literally "submachine gun") is a type of sandwich in Belgium commonly served at friteries and cafés. It is popular among students.

It is thought to have originated in Brussels, but is also popular in Flanders, Wallonia, and the Nord region of France, where it is also known as an "Américain" (literally an "American").

Composition
A typical mitraillette consists of:
 Half a baguette (or sometimes a smaller version of a baguette).
 Fries
 Fried meat (such as sausage, burger, or steak). The type of meat available varies with the friterie.
 Sauce, such as mayonnaise, ketchup, sauce andalouse, garlic sauce, bearnaise sauce.

Crudités may be included (grated carrot, fresh lettuce, tomato slices), as well as cheese and cabbage.

Originally mitraillettes only contained a sausage or sliced meat. Alternatives quickly became available.

In popular culture
After the Brussels bombings in March 2016, images of the sandwich were shared across social media in Belgium and abroad as a sign of friendship and humour.

In December 2020, former Top Chef (France) contestant Jean-Philippe Watteyne opened a pop-up mitraillette restaurant in Mons.

See also
 List of sandwiches
 French tacos, a French fast-food item containing similar ingredients wrapped in a flour tortilla

References

Belgian cuisine
French cuisine
Sandwiches
Fast food
French fries